Dongshin University is a private university in southwestern South Korea.  Its campus is located in Naju, a city in South Jeolla province which borders Gwangju.  It enrolls about 7,000 students; the class of 2003 contained 1,378 students .  The current president is Kyun-Bum Lee.

Academics

Engineering, originally the school's sole focus, continues to be that of its College of Engineering.  Additional undergraduate courses of study are provided through the College of Information and Science, College of Humanities and Social Science, College of Art, and College of Oriental Medicine.   The university provides graduate instruction through its general graduate school, as well as the graduate schools of education and social development.

History

Having received permission to open in July 1985, the school held its first classes in 1987.  At that time it bore the name Dongshin College of Engineering (동신공과학대학).  The current name was adopted when the school gained university status in 1992.

On January 14, 2019, the Ministry of Education canceled the degrees for the following celebrities, due to special treatment:

 Chu Ga-Yeol, singer, song-writer
 Jang Hyun-seung, singer (former BEAST and Trouble Maker)
 Lee Gi-Kwang, singer (Highlight)
 Seo Eunkwang, singer (BtoB)
Yong Jun-hyung, rapper (former Highlight)
Yoon Doo-joon, singer (Highlight)
Yook Sung-jae, singer (BtoB)

Sister schools

Dongshin University maintains international ties with 12 universities in China, 5 in the United States, and 1 each in Canada (University of Alberta), Japan (Momoyama Gakuin University), Indonesia (Pancasila University), and Australia (Edith Cowan University).

Notable alumni
Chu Ga-Yeol, singer, song-writer
Jang Hyun-seung, singer (former BEAST and Trouble Maker)
Kim Mi-sook, actress
Lee Gi-Kwang, singer (Highlight)
Leo, singer (VIXX)
Seo Eunkwang, singer (BtoB)
Yong Jun-hyung, rapper (former Highlight)
Yoon Doo-joon, singer (Highlight)
Yook Sung-jae, singer (BtoB)

See also
List of colleges and universities in South Korea
Education in South Korea

References

External links
Official school website, in Korean

Universities and colleges in South Jeolla Province
Naju
Educational institutions established in 1987
1987 establishments in South Korea